The women's 4 x 6 km relay biathlon competition of the Pyeongchang 2018 Olympics was held on 22 February 2018 at the Alpensia Biathlon Centre in Pyeongchang, South Korea.

Qualification

Schedule
All times are (UTC+9).

Results
The race started at 20:15.

References

relay